Pursell is a surname. Notable people with the surname include:

Bill Pursell (1926–2020), American composer and former session pianist
Bob Pursell (footballer born 1889) (1889–1974), footballer
Bob Pursell (footballer born 1919) (1919–2005), Scottish footballer
Carl Pursell (1932–2009), politician from the U.S. state of Michigan
Isaac Pursell (1853–1910), Philadelphia, Pennsylvania-based architect
Peter Pursell (1894–1968), Scottish footballer

See also
Purell
Ursell